The Unteraargletscher, literally "Lower Aare-Glacier", is the larger of the two sources of the Aare river in the Bernese Alps. Its lower end is (or was) almost 400 metres lower than that of the neighbouring Oberaargletscher.
 
In 18th and 19th centuries, it was one of the first subjects of developing glaciology.

See also
List of glaciers in Switzerland
List of glaciers
Retreat of glaciers since 1850
Swiss Alps
Rhône Glacier

External links
Swiss glacier monitoring network
 "Viatimages", Université de Lausanne/Bibliothéque nationale Suisse
 Carte du Glacier inférieur de l'Aar, levée en 1842, d'après les directions de m.Agassiz par Jean Wild, Ingénieur (Neuchâtel Public and University Library, cote: IGH Txt 129.6.3)
 Réseau trigonométrique de la carte du glacier inférieur de l'Aar (1847) (Neuchâtel Public and University Library, cote: IGH Txt 129.6.3)
 Carte du glacier inférieur de l'Aar (1844) (Neuchâtel Public and University Library, cote: BPUN Q 820 A)
 Unteraargletscher in the Topographic Atlas of Switzerland 1870–1922

Glaciers of the canton of Bern
Glaciers of the Alps
Aare
GUnteraar